Alexander Randle White (born October 22, 1988) is an American mixed martial artist who competed as a featherweight in the Ultimate Fighting Championship.

Background
Born and raised Tuscumbia, Missouri, White was critically injured as a toddler when he mistakenly drank gasoline placed in a milk jug near other jugs that were filled with lemonade.  The gasoline accident burned his vocal cords, damaged his hearing and contributed to a minor speech impediment.  As a young adult, White was in and out of homelessness for a time before discovering combat sports: First, boxing, then mixed martial arts.

Mixed martial arts career

Early career
White began his mixed martial arts career in 2009, compiling a 3-0 amateur record before turning professional the following year. Along the way he compiled an undefeated record on the regional circuit, competing mostly in his native Missouri before signing with the UFC in March 2014.

Ultimate Fighting Championship
White made his promotional debut on April 19, 2014, at UFC on Fox 11 against Estevan Payan, replacing an injured Mike Brown. He won his debut via first-round KO.

White faced Lucas Martins on July 16, 2014, at UFC Fight Night 45, again as a short notice replacement, filling in for an injured Jim Alers. He lost the back-and-forth fight via knockout due to punches in the third round.

White next faced Clay Collard on December 6, 2014, at UFC 181. He lost the fight via unanimous decision.

White was expected to face Mark Eddiva on May 16, 2015, at UFC Fight Night 66.  However, on April 26, it was announced that White suffered an undisclosed injury and was forced out of the bout.

White faced Artem Lobov on February 2, 2016, at UFC Fight Night 82. He won the fight by unanimous decision.

White was expected to face Ryan Hall on July 13, 2016, at UFC Fight Night 91. However, the bout was scrapped on June 28 as White pulled out due to an undisclosed injury. In turn, Hall elected to fight on a different date rather than have the promotion find him a replacement.

White was tabbed as a short notice replacement and faced Anthony Rocco Martin in a lightweight bout on January 15, 2017, at UFC Fight Night 103. He lost the fight via unanimous decision.

White faced Mitch Clarke on September 9, 2017, at UFC 215. He won the fight via TKO in the second round.

White faced James Krause on January 14, 2018, at UFC Fight Night: Stephens vs. Choi. He lost the fight by unanimous decision.

White faced Jim Miller on September 8, 2018, at UFC 228. He lost the fight via submission in the first round.

White faced Dan Moret on March 9, 2019, at UFC Fight Night 146. He won the fight by unanimous decision.

White faced Rafael Fiziev on October 26, 2019, at UFC on ESPN+ 20. He lost the fight via unanimous decision.

In February 2020, White was released from the UFC.

Post UFC 
In his first appearance after being released from the UFC, White faced Zack Davis at Cage of Honor 85 for the COH Welterweight title. He won the bout via TKO stoppage in the second round.

Championships and achievements

Mixed martial arts
Ultimate Fighting Championship
Performance of the Night (One time)
Cage of Honor
COH Welterweight Championship (One time)

Mixed martial arts record

|-
|Win
|align=center|14–6
|Zack Davis
|TKO (strikes)
|Cage of Honor 85
|
|align=center|2
|align=center|1:48
|Cape Girardeau, Missouri, United States
|
|-
|Loss
|align=center|13–6
|Rafael Fiziev
|Decision (unanimous)
|UFC Fight Night: Maia vs. Askren 
|
|align=center|3
|align=center|5:00
|Kallang, Singapore
|
|-
|Win
|align=center|13–5
|Dan Moret
|Decision (unanimous)
|UFC Fight Night: Lewis vs. dos Santos 
|
|align=center|3
|align=center|5:00
|Wichita, Kansas, United States
|
|-
|Loss
|align=center|12–5
|Jim Miller
|Submission (rear-naked choke)
|UFC 228 
|
|align=center|1
|align=center|1:29
|Dallas, Texas, United States
|
|-
|Loss
|align=center|12–4
|James Krause
|Decision (unanimous)
|UFC Fight Night: Stephens vs. Choi
|
|align=center|3
|align=center|5:00
|St. Louis, Missouri, United States
|
|-
|Win
|align=center|12–3
|Mitch Clarke
|TKO (punches)
|UFC 215 
|
|align=center|2
|align=center|4:36
|Edmonton, Alberta, Canada
|
|-
|Loss
|align=center|11–3
|Anthony Rocco Martin
|Decision (unanimous)
|UFC Fight Night: Rodríguez vs. Penn
|
|align=center|3
|align=center|5:00
|Phoenix, Arizona, United States
| 
|-
|Win
|align=center|11–2
|Artem Lobov
|Decision (unanimous)
|UFC Fight Night: Hendricks vs. Thompson 
|
|align=center|3
|align=center|5:00
|Las Vegas, Nevada, United States
|
|-
|Loss
|align=center|10–2
|Clay Collard
| Decision (unanimous)
|UFC 181
|
|align=center|3
|align=center|5:00
|Las Vegas, Nevada, United States
|
|-
|Loss
|align=center| 10–1
|Lucas Martins
|KO (punches)
|UFC Fight Night: Cowboy vs. Miller
|
|align=center|3
|align=center|2:08
|Atlantic City, New Jersey, United States
|
|-
|Win
|align=center| 10–0
|Estevan Payan
|KO (punches)
|UFC on Fox: Werdum vs. Browne
|
|align=center|1
|align=center|1:28
|Orlando, Florida, United States
|
|-
| Win
|align=center| 9–0
|Adam Rider
|Submission (triangle choke)
|Rumble Time Promotions: Rumble at the Chase
|
|align=center|1
|align=center|1:58
|St. Louis, Missouri, United States
|
|-
| Win
|align=center| 8–0
| Will Shutt
| TKO (punches)
|Cage Fighting Events
|November 1, 2013
|align=center| 1
|align=center| 2:32
|St. Charles, Missouri, United States
|
|-
| Win
|align=center| 7–0
|Roy Babcock
| TKO (corner stoppage)
|Titan Fighting Championship 26
|August 30, 2013
|align=center|2
|align=center|5:00
|Kansas City, Missouri, United States
|
|-
| Win
|align=center| 6–0
|Adam Ward
| Decision (split)
|Cage Fighting Events
|April 5, 2013
|align=center|3
|align=center|5:00
|St. Charles, Missouri, United States
|
|-
| Win
|align=center| 5–0
|Charon Spain
| TKO (retirement)
|Rumble Time Promotions
|October 26, 2012
|align=center|2
|align=center|5:00
|St. Charles, Missouri, United States
|
|-
| Win
|align=center| 4–0
|Javon Wright
| Submission (rear-naked choke)
|Cage Championships 39
|August 18, 2012
|align=center|2
|align=center|3:15
|Sullivan, Missouri, United States
|
|-
| Win
|align=center| 3–0
|Mark Nguyen
| Submission (armbar)
|Cage Championships 38
|June 23, 2012
|align=center|1
|align=center|3:47
|Sullivan, Missouri, United States
|
|-
| Win
|align=center| 2–0
|Greg Wilson Jr.
| Submission (rear-naked choke)
|Fight Me MMA
|April 13, 2012
|align=center|2
|align=center|2:05
|St. Charles, Missouri, United States
|
|-
| Win
|align=center| 1–0 
|Pietro Falco
| Submission (guillotine choke)
|La Resa dei Conti 12
|November 19, 2010
|align=center|1
|align=center|0:00
|Livorno, Italy
|
|-

See also
 List of current UFC fighters
 List of male mixed martial artists

References

External links
 UFC Profile
 

American male mixed martial artists
Mixed martial artists from Missouri
Featherweight mixed martial artists
Mixed martial artists utilizing Brazilian jiu-jitsu
People from Farmington, Missouri
Living people
1988 births
People from Miller County, Missouri
Ultimate Fighting Championship male fighters
American practitioners of Brazilian jiu-jitsu